Perton may refer to:

Companies
Petron Corporation, the largest oil refining and marketing company in the Philippines

Settlements
Perton a village in Staffordshire, England.
Perton, Herefordshire, a hamlet in Herefordshire, England

People
Petron (physician) (Πέτρων), also called Petronas, an ancient Greek physician
Petron, an ancient Greek writer from the city of Himera in Sicily, mentioned by Plutarch in the "De defectu oraculorum"
Victor Perton (born 1958), Australian politician